Pietro Boer (born 12 May 2002) is an Italian professional footballer who plays as a goalkeeper for Serie A club Roma.

Career 
A youth product of Venezia, Boer signed with Roma on 15 August 2018. He made his professional debut with Roma in a 3–1 UEFA Europa League loss to CSKA Sofia on 10 December 2020.

Honours
Roma
 UEFA Europa Conference League: 2021–22

References

External links
 
 Roma Profile

Living people
2002 births
People from Mestre-Carpenedo
Italian people of Dutch descent
Italian footballers
Footballers from Venice
Association football goalkeepers
A.S. Roma players